Sam and the Womp is a British pop group consisting of trumpeter Sam Ritchie and Dutch-born vocalist Bloem de Ligny, also known as Lady Oo. The band's music mixes traditional elements of Balkan music with modern dub and drum 'n' bass elements. From its formation in 2009 to 2014, the band also included producer Aaron "Audio" Horn, the son of musician and producer Trevor Horn.

The group's debut single "Bom Bom" was released as a digital download on 19 August 2012, went to the No. 1 spot in the UK Singles Chart and has sold over a million copies worldwide. In 2012, they signed to Stiff Records and One More Tune.

Music career

2009–2013: Formation and "Bom Bom"
Sam and the Womp was formed in September 2009 when Ritchie and de Ligny's band QDOS joined forces with Horn.

Initially signed to Stiff Records, Sam and the Womp released "Bom Bom" under a licensing deal with One More Tune on 20 August 2012. The track gained further momentum after being used to soundtrack an international TV advertising campaign for Southern Comfort. Les Mills uses it for their biceps workout track in Body Pump.  The song is also featured in the video games Forza Horizon and The Sims 3: Island Paradise, on the Channel 4 TV show Big Fat Gypsy Weddings, and in an episode of the CBS TV program Elementary. Kmart Australia also featured the song in their 2013 series of TV commercials. The song has also been used in a series of Canadian TV commercials for the Joe Fresh line of clothing. The track went to number one in the UK Official Singles Chart in its first week of release.

"Bom Bom" was co-produced by music producer and film composer Raz Olsher, Horn and Ritchie at Fossil Studios in Hackney, London. The song was co-written by Horn, Ritchie, de Ligny and Olsher.

2014–present
Horn left the group in 2014, and Ritchie and de Ligny continued as a duo.

Ritchie and de Ligny co-founded Womp Records Ltd. in 2015.

On 15 January 2018, the band's debut EP, Womp Records, Vol. 1 was released. On 1 May 2018, Sam and the Womp released the single "Posh Ragga", which features MC Solomon. This is the lead single from the band's second EP Bee Sides, which was released on 18 May 2018. "Ice Cream Man" was released later in the year.

In 2021 they released a single called “Sun Dance” with fellow British rapper K.O.G.

Members

Current 

 Sam Ritchie – trumpet (2009–present)
Bloem de Ligny – vocals (2009–present)

Former 

 Aaron Horn – Co founder producer writer (2009-2014)

Discography

EPs

Singles

References

British electronic music duos
British dance music groups
British pop music duos
Musical groups established in 2009